Rancho Santa Inés Airstrip , also known as Cataviña Airstrip, is a public airstrip located South of Cataviña, Municipality of Ensenada, Baja California, Mexico, just in the middle of the Cataviña Desert National Reserve. The airfield is used solely for general aviation purposes. 
The ranch offers rooms and bunkhouse accommodations for the night as well as food.  The ruins of Mission Santa Maria are  further east on a poorly maintained dirt road.

External links
CTV at Airport List.
CTV at The Airport Guide.
Baja Bush Pilots forum about CTV.
Info about Cataviña, BC.

Airports in Baja California